Like Radio 90.1 (DYJM 90.1 MHz) is an FM station owned and operated by Capitol Broadcasting Center. Its studios and transmitter are located along Calbayog-Catarman Rd., Catarman, Northern Samar.

References

External links
Like Radio Catarman FB Page
Like Radio Catarman Website

Radio stations established in 2016
Radio stations in Northern Samar